Silvester Sedborough (1515/16-1551), of Porlock, Somerset, was an English politician.

Family
Sedborough was the eldest son of William Sedborough of Porlock and Joan, a sister and coheiress of Jerome Bratton of Porlock. Silvester Sedborough married twice, firstly to Anne Staveley, by whom he had one son, Robert, and two daughters. By 1550, he had married a woman named Mary.

Career
He was a Member (MP) of the Parliament of England for Bath in 1545.

References

1510s births
1551 deaths
English MPs 1545–1547
People from Somerset